The Lewis–Cutler ministry or First Lewis ministry was the 68th ministry of the New South Wales Government, and was led by the 33rd Premier, Tom Lewis, of the Liberal Party in coalition with the Country Party, led by Sir Charles Cutler. It was the first of two occasions when Lewis was Premier; and the seventh and final occasion when Cutler served as Deputy Premier.

Background
Lewis was elected to the New South Wales Legislative Assembly in 1957 and served continuously until 1978, representing the seat of Wollondilly. When the Askin government came to power in 1965, Lewis was given relatively junior portfolios of Lands and Mines. In 1972, Tourism was added to his ministerial responsibilities when Eric Willis moved to Education. Late in 1974, Askin announced his resignation and Lewis was chosen as leader over Willis and Justice Minister John Maddison.

Cutler was elected to the NSW Legislative Assembly in 1947 and served continuously until 1975, representing the seat of Orange. Elected Deputy Leader of the Country Party in 1958, Cutler was elected as leader of his party following the 1959 state election, replacing Davis Hughes.

Lewis inherited a relatively stable government that had been in power for ten years. However, the Liberal government was engaged in almost daily warfare with the Whitlam Labor federal government, most notably over the Medibank health care scheme, to which New South Wales was the last state to sign.

Composition of ministry

The composition of the ministry was announced by Premier Lewis and sworn in on 3 January 1975, and covers the period from 3 January 1975, when the former Premier, Sir Robert Askin resigned as Premier and as Member for Pittwater, until 17 December 1975, the day after Cutler resigned as Deputy Premier, the Leader of the Country Party, and as Member for Orange. There were minor rearrangements in June 1975 following the resignation of Milton Morris and in October 1975 when Wal Fife resigned in order to successfully contest the Australian House of Representatives seat of Farrer at the 1975 federal election.

 
Ministers are members of the Legislative Assembly unless otherwise noted.

See also

Members of the New South Wales Legislative Assembly, 1973–1976
Members of the New South Wales Legislative Council, 1973–1976

Notes

References

 

New South Wales ministries
1975 establishments in Australia
1975 disestablishments in Australia